Cwi Bwamu, or simply Cwi (Twĩ), is a Gur language of Burkina Faso.

References

Bwa languages (Gur)
Languages of Burkina Faso